D' may resemble:
 D' (D + apostrophe), the contracted form of words in several languages (for example, a French indefinite article); for a full list, see the Wiktionary entry
 Dʼ (D + modifier apostrophe), Slavic notation for  palatalised d
 Ď, ď in lower case (D + caron), a letter of the Czech and Slovak alphabets
 D′ (D + prime), used for example to represent the sensitivity index in statistics
 Ḋ (D + overdot)
 Dʻ (D + ʻokina)
 Dʾ (D + right half ring)
 Dʿ (D + left half ring)